

PRAFL Championship (2014–present)
Numbers in parentheses in the table are Championship appearances, as of the date of that Championships and are used as follows:
 Winning team and Losing team columns indicate the number of times that team has appeared in the Championship as well as each respective teams' Super Bowl record to date.
 Venue column indicates number of times that stadium has hosted the Championship.
 City column indicates number of times that that metropolitan area has hosted the Championship.

Championship appearances by team

In the sortable table below, teams are ordered first by number of appearances, then by number of wins, and finally by year of first appearance. In the "Season(s)" column, bold years indicate winning seasons.

References

Champions
Champions